Castelverde (Lombard: Castegnìn) is a comune (municipality) in the Province of Cremona in the Italian region Lombardy, located about  southeast of Milan and about  northwest of Cremona.

Castelverde borders the following municipalities: Casalbuttano ed Uniti, Cremona, Olmeneta, Paderno Ponchielli, Persico Dosimo, Pozzaglio ed Uniti, Sesto ed Uniti.

References

Cities and towns in Lombardy